The Paris Conference on Passports & Customs Formalities and Through Tickets was a conference organised by the League of Nations in 1920 which agreed, for the first time, on a set of standards for all passports issued by members of the League. Prior to that time, there were no internationally agreed standards for passports because they were not generally required for travel until World War I.

References

League of Nations
Diplomatic conferences in France
20th-century diplomatic conferences
Passports
1920 in France
1920 in international relations
Conferences in Paris
1920 conferences
20th century in Paris